Glasgow High Kelvinside , often abbreviated to GHK, is an amateur rugby union club in Glasgow, Scotland. They currently play in Scottish National League Division One.

History

Glasgow High Kelvinside was formed in 1982 by the merger of Kelvinside Academy and High School of Glasgow rugby clubs; Kelvinside Academicals and Glasgow HSFP. Both Glasgow High FP and Kelvinside Accies were struggling clubs at the time: Glasgow High in the Third Division; Kelvinside Academicals in the Fifth Division.

Impact of professionalism

When professionalism was finally allowed by the International Rugby Football Board in 1995, Scotland took a while to adapt. The SRU decided to make Scotland's four district teams professional in 1996. Glasgow's district team became the professional rugby union team now known as Glasgow Warriors.

However it was recognised that the amateur Glasgow clubs might provide a better pathway to professionalism for their players if some of the amateur Glasgow area clubs merged. The clubs considered for merger were Glasgow High Kelvinside, Glasgow Academicals and West of Scotland. Taking an initial letter each from High, Academicals, West and Kelvinside it was proposed the new side would be called the Glasgow Hawks.

The Milngavie-based club West of Scotland pulled out of the planned merger. Nevertheless, Glasgow Academicals and Glasgow High Kelvinside did merge in 1997. The name Hawks was kept for the merged team.

Glasgow Hawks

The merger of the two sides was not without its detractors and a few on each side of the GHK - Academical fence were concerned about losing their history in the new side. Glasgow Academicals continued as a league side the following year in 1998 but they had to start again at the bottom rung of the league structure.

Glasgow High Kelvinside reborn

Following the Academicals example of starting again, Glasgow High Kelvinside also started again in the bottom rung of the league structure. However they remain associated with the Glasgow Hawks.

In June 2014, former Glasgow Warriors and GHK player Cameron Little was announced as the head coach at the club for the 2015–16 season. The club won promotion to  Scottish National League Division Three after winning all 18 league matches in the 2014–15 season. It followed that up by winning the Scottish National League Division Three title in the 2015–16 season and gaining promotion to the Scottish National League Division Two in the 2016–17 season. In 2020 Peter Wright "The Teapot" was named as head coach. In the 2021/2022 season, they won promotion to Scottish National League Division One.

Sevens

The club once ran the Glasgow High Kelvinside Sevens tournament. Kelvinside Academicals had a history with Sevens - running their own tournament in 1922 and then from 1974 to 1981, with teams playing for the Minerva Cup. Glasgow HSFP ran theirs on just one occasion in 1929. (Glasgow HSFP won the 1922 Kelvinside Academicals Sevens, Dunfermline won the Glasgow HSFP Sevens of 1929.) When the sides merged as Glasgow High Kelvinside the Glasgow High Kelvinside Sevens tournament still offered the Minerva Cup for its winners from 1982 until it folded in 1989.

Honours
 Scottish National League Division Two: 2021-2022
 Scottish National League Division Three: 2015–16
 Langholm Sevens: 1995
 Clarkston Sevens: 1984 
 Greenock Sevens: 1984, 1987
 Ayr Sevens: 1994
 Allan Glen's Sevens: 1984
 Hillhead Jordanhill Sevens: 1989, 1991, 1992, 1993, 1994, 1996
 Hillhead Sevens: 1985, 1987
 Bearsden Sevens: 1990
 Glasgow University Sevens: 1987
 Helensburgh Sevens: 1986
 Lochaber Sevens: 1992
 Cambuslang Sevens: 1990

Notable former players

Scotland internationalists

The following former Glasgow High Kelvinside players have represented Scotland at full international level.

Glasgow Warriors
The following former Glasgow High Kelvinside players have represented Glasgow Warriors at professional level.

References

External links
GHK website

Rugby clubs established in 1982
Scottish rugby union teams
Rugby union in Glasgow
1982 establishments in Scotland
Sports teams in Glasgow